Love Walked In is a 1997 Argentine-American neo-noir drama/thriller film co-written and directed by Juan José Campanella and starring Denis Leary, Terence Stamp and Aitana Sánchez-Gijón. It was based on the novel Ni el tiro del final ("Not Even The Final Shot") by Argentine writer José Pablo Feinmann. The film takes its title from George Gershwin's song "Love Walked In".

Plot synopsis 
Jack (Denis Leary) is a world-weary pianist and writer in a lounge named the Blue Cat. His wife, Vicki (Aitana Sánchez-Gijón), is a songstress who has a way with the "pseudo-Gershwin" tunes her husband writes. The couple is desperately poor after 10 years of touring crummy clubs.

Meanwhile, Fred Moore (Terence Stamp), the club owner, is captivated by the beauty of Vicki. Moore is married to a wealthy woman, known only as Mrs. Moore (Marj Dusay), whom he admits to having married for her money. Although Fred is a faithful husband, the jealous Mrs. Moore has hired Eddie (Michael Badalucco), a private detective who happens to be an old friend of Jack's, to gather evidence of Fred's infidelity. Having come up with nothing, the sleazy detective begs Jack to help by arranging for Vicki to seduce Fred in front of a hidden camera. Together Jack, Vicky and Eddie plan to blackmail Moore.

At the same time Jack is also writing a crime short story set in the 1930s, a noiresque crime thriller, which the viewer sees inter cut in imaginary scenes as Jack narrates. This secondary narration is also a telling of what happens with Jack and Vicki in a different and subtle way.

Cast 
 Denis Leary as Jack Hanaway
 Terence Stamp as Fred Moore
 Aitana Sánchez-Gijón as Vicky Rivas
 Michael Badalucco as Eddie Bianco
 Danny Nucci as Cousin Matt
 Marj Dusay as Mrs. Moore
 Neal Huff as Howard
 J.K. Simmons as Mr. Shulman
 Moira Kelly as Vera
 Justin Lazard as Lenny
 Rocco Sisto as Ilm Zamsky
 Gene Canfield as Joey
 Jimmy McQuaid as Young Howard
 Murphy Guyer as Howard's Boss
 Paul Eagle as Landlord
 Fiddle Viracola as Aunt Ethel
 Jeremy Webb as Hampton's Waiter
 Gregory Scanlon as Valet
 Gary DeWitt Marshall as Broken Ivory Bartender
 D.C. Benny as Comedian
 Patrick Boll as Porter

Reception

Dennis Schwartz gave the film a grade D.

Roger Ebert gave the film 2 out of 4.
Stephen Holden of the New York Times wrote: "Nothing in "Love Walked In" makes psychological or even economic sense. In one preposterous plot turn after another, the movie does awkward somersaults to try to drum up tension and generate heat."

TWA Flight 800 Disaster
On the evening of July 17, 1996, at 8:31 pm, the production was filming in the banquet hall of a Westhampton, NY beach club.  Camera and sound equipment were recording when TWA Flight 800 exploded directly south of the beach.   Sounds of the blast were caught on sound recording equipment.  Two blasts were heard by crew members.

References

External links 
 
 
 

1997 films
1997 crime thriller films
1997 drama films
1990s thriller drama films
Films set in the United States
American thriller drama films
TriStar Pictures films
1990s English-language films
1990s American films